The Sonata in A minor (HWV 362) was composed (c. 1712) by George Frideric Handel for recorder and basso continuo (the autograph manuscript, a fair copy made most likely in 1712, gives this instrumentation in Italian: "flauto e cembalo"). The work is also referred to as Opus 1 No. 4, and was first published in 1732 by Walsh. Other catalogues of Handel's music have referred to the work as HG xxvii, 15; and HHA iv/3,21.

Both the Walsh edition and the Chrysander edition indicate that the work is for recorder ("flauto"), and published it as Sonata IV.

A typical performance of the work takes about 11 minutes.

Movements
The work consists of four movements:

(Movements do not contain repeat markings unless indicated. The number of bars is taken from the Chrysander edition, and is the raw number in the manuscript—not including repeat markings.)

See also
List of solo sonatas by George Frideric Handel
XV Handel solo sonatas (publication by Chrysander)
Handel solo sonatas (publication by Walsh)

References

Recorder sonatas by George Frideric Handel
Compositions in A minor
1726 compositions